Shawn Peter Morimando (born November 20, 1992) is an American professional baseball pitcher for the CTBC Brothers of the Chinese Professional Baseball League (CPBL). He made his Major League Baseball (MLB) debut in 2016 with the Cleveland Indians and has also played for the Miami Marlins.

Career

Cleveland Indians
Morimando was drafted by the Cleveland Indians in the 19th round of the 2011 Major League Baseball draft out of Ocean Lakes High School in Virginia Beach, Virginia. He signed with the Indians and made his professional debut with the rookie-level Arizona League Indians. He spent 2012 with the Single-A Lake County Captains, posting a 7-6 record and 3.59 ERA. For the 2013 season, Morimando played with the High-A Carolina Mudcats, recording an 8-13 record and 3.73 ERA in 27 appearances. Morimando split the 2014 season between Carolina and Double-A Akron RubberDucks, accumulating a 10-9 record and 3.30 ERA in 28 games between the two teams. He returned to Akron for the 2015 season, registering a 10-12 record and 3.18 ERA with 128 strikeouts in 158.2 innings of work. The Indians added Morimando to their 40-man roster after the season.

On July 2, 2016, Morimando was added to the 40-man roster from Akron and made his MLB debut. He made two appearances for the Indians, pitching on July 2 against the Toronto Blue Jays and August 5 against the New York Yankees, allowing 6 runs in 4.2 innings. Morimando spent the 2017 season with the Triple-A Columbus Clippers, winning 10 games and losing 9 with a 4.41 earned run average (ERA). After posting a 7.03 ERA through the first five games of the 2018 season, Morimando was released by the Indians on July 1, 2018.

Toronto Blue Jays
Morimando signed a minor league deal with the Toronto Blue Jays on July 9, 2018, and pitched in four games for the Buffalo Bisons. He spent the full 2019 season with Buffalo, winning two games and losing five with a 6.01 ERA in 16 games. On November 4, 2019, he elected free agency.

Lancaster Barnstormers
On May 8, 2020, Morimando signed with the Lancaster Barnstormers of the Atlantic League of Professional Baseball. He did not play a game for the team because of the cancellation of the 2020 ALPB season due to the COVID-19 pandemic and became a free agent after the year.

Miami Marlins
On February 16, 2021, Morimando signed a minor league contract with the Miami Marlins organization. On May 22, Morimando was selected to the active roster. He was outrighted to the Triple-A Jacksonville Jumbo Shrimp on May 31. On July 9, Morimando was re-selected to the active roster. Morimando tossed 5.0 scoreless innings against the Atlanta Braves, notching five strikeouts and walking four, but was designated for assignment the next day. He was again outrighted to Jacksonville on July 13. On August 9, Morimando's contract was once again selected by the Marlins. On August 14, Morimando was designated for assignment by the Marlins again.
On September 29, Morimando was released by the Marlins.

CTBC Brothers
On September 29, 2021, Morimando signed with the CTBC Brothers of the Chinese Professional Baseball League. On December 28, 2021, he agreed to a contract with the Brothers for the 2022 season. On July 10, 2022, he was released.

SSG Landers
On July 11, 2022, Morimando signed with the SSG Landers of the Korea Baseball Organization. He became a free agent following the 2022 season.

CTBC Brothers (second stint)
On December 25, 2022, Morimando signed with the CTBC Brothers of the Chinese Professional Baseball League.

References

External links

1992 births
Living people
Sportspeople from Virginia Beach, Virginia
Baseball players from Virginia
Major League Baseball pitchers
Cleveland Indians players
Miami Marlins players
Arizona League Indians players
Lake County Captains players
Carolina Mudcats players
Akron RubberDucks players
Columbus Clippers players
Gulf Coast Blue Jays players
Buffalo Bisons (minor league) players
Surprise Saguaros players
Canberra Cavalry players
Jacksonville Jumbo Shrimp players
American expatriate baseball players in Australia